Hello is the first non-independent studio album from American Christian rock band After Edmund. It was released on February 26, 2008 through Slanted Records. Four radio singles were released off the album: "Thank God", "Like a Dream", "Fighting For Your Heart (Let It Go)" and "Clouds". The album was nominated at the 51st Grammy Awards of 2009 for Best Rock or Rap Gospel Album.

Track listing
"Thank God" - 3:18
"Fighting For Your Heart (Let It Go)" - 4:06
"Everyone" - 3:37
"Like a Dream" - 3:30
"Darkest Room" - 00:42
"Come and Rain Down" - 4:36
"Tears" - 3:52
"Stealing Away" - 4:19 
"Go Oboe!" - 1:56
"Clouds" - 4:26
"It's Alright" - 3:16
"To See You Leave" - 5:17

Awards

The album was nominated for a Dove Award for Rock/Contemporary Album of the Year at the 40th GMA Dove Awards.

References

2008 albums
After Edmund albums